The 2019–20 Championnat National season was the 27th season since the establishment of the Championnat National, and the 22nd in its current format, which serves as the third division of the French football league system. The season was suspended indefinitely on 12 March 2020 due to the COVID-19 pandemic.

On 28 April 2020, the French Prime Minister Edouard Philippe announced that there would be no sporting events, even behind closed doors, before September 2020, thus in effect ending the season.  On 11 May the executive committee of the FFF announced that the top two teams (Pau FC and USL Dunkerque) would be promoted to Ligue 2, but that no promotion playoff would take place, and no champion would be declared.

Team changes 
Team changes from the 2018–19 Championnat National were confirmed by the FFF on 12 July.

To National
Promoted from National 2
Créteil
Le Puy
Toulon
Bastia-Borgo

Relegated from Ligue 2
Béziers
Red Star
Gazélec Ajaccio

From National
Relegated to National 2
Tours 
Drancy
L'Entente SSG
Marignane Gignac

Promoted to Ligue 2
Rodez
Chambly
Le Mans

Stadia and locations

Special rule changes
Due to the premature cancellation of the season before completion, special rules were put in place by the FFF Executive Committed to rank clubs, superseding the normal competition rules.

 1. Points per game completed
 2. Number of points gained in head-to-head matches (only where all scheduled matches between all tied teams have completed)
 3. Goal difference in head-to-head matches (only where all scheduled matches between all tied teams have completed)
 4. Number of away games completed, as a percentage of overall number of games completed
 5. Goal difference per game completed
 6. Goals scored per game completed
 7. Fair play
 8. Better classification, based on completion of the first set of round robin games (only if all clubs have completed at least one game against all other clubs)
 9. Drawing of lots

League table

Top scorers

References

Championnat National seasons
3
France
France